Mac Jordan Amartey (1936–2018) was a popular Ghanaian actor. He was a veteran actor who played major roles in Ghanaian movies.

In 2017, he disclosed that he used a prosthetic leg after an amputation as a result of diabetes. Amartey was very popular in a lot of Ghanaian movies including the popular Idikoko TV series.

Filmography 
 Matters of the Heart (1993)
Black Star (2006)
The Returnee 2 (1995)
Victim of Love (1998)
Fatal Decision

Death 
Mac Jordan died at the Korle Bu Teaching Hospital on July 6, 2018, after battling with diabetes. He left behind a wife and four children.

References

External links
 

Ghanaian actors
1936 births
2018 deaths